Thomas Henry Baker (May 6, 1934 – March 9, 1980) was a left-handed relief pitcher in Major League Baseball who played for the Chicago Cubs in 1963.

Career
In , Baker was signed as an amateur free agent by the St. Louis Cardinals. After years in the Cardinals system, Baker was drafted by the Kansas City Athletics in the minor league draft in 1959. However, two years later Baker was again in the minor league draft, this time being drafted by the Baltimore Orioles. In 1963, Baker was sent to the Washington Senators as part of a conditional deal. Baker didn't stay in Washington long. On March 26, 1963, just about three months after being sent to the Senators, Baker was sent back to the Orioles. About two months later, on May 27, 1963, Baker was purchased from the Orioles by the Chicago Cubs. It was in Chicago where Baker spent the remainder of his career.

Baker made his major league debut on August 2, 1963, with the Cubs at age 29. On that day, Baker faced only one batter, Willie McCovey. Baker was pulled after hitting McCovey with a pitch. This made Baker one of the few pitchers to hit the first batter they ever faced. The Cubs won the game 12–11. Baker played his final major league game for the Cubs on September 14, 1963. During Baker's time in the majors, he was one of four left-handed pitchers on the Cubs staff, the others being Dick Ellsworth, Jim Brewer, and Dick LeMay.

At the time of his retirement, Baker had earned a career earned run average of 3.00. He finished with 18 innings pitched, striking out 14 batters, and playing in a total of 10 games. He allowed 20 hits, 2 home runs, and 7 walks. Baker's lifetime record was 0–1. Baker came to bat only three times in his career, recording a batting average of .000. His lifetime fielding percentage is 1.000.

References

External links

1934 births
1980 deaths
Major League Baseball pitchers
Baseball players from Washington (state)
Chicago Cubs players
Hawaii Islanders players
Rochester Red Wings players
Seattle Angels players
Tulsa Oilers (baseball) players
Salt Lake City Bees players
People from Port Townsend, Washington
Dallas Rangers players